Ed Roush may refer to:
Edd Roush (1893–1988), Major League Baseball player
J. Edward Roush (1920–2004), U.S. Representative from Indiana